Seminary is an unincorporated community in Lee County, Virginia, in the United States. It had previously been known as Turkey Cove, and during the American Civil War the 64th Virginia Infantry trained on the church grounds, partly because its chaplain was Reuben Steele.

History
Seminary was named after the local United Methodist Church seminary.

References

Unincorporated communities in Lee County, Virginia
Unincorporated communities in Virginia